Igor Mihaljević (born 8 August 1979) is a Croatian heavyweight kickboxer, fighting out of Karlovac.

Biography and career
Mihaljević fought many top class kickboxers as Daniel Ghiță, Cătălin Moroșanu, Tyrone Spong, and his biggest win is over Gary Goodridge.

On 7 April 2012 it was announced that he would fight Gregory Tony for W.A.K.O. Pro Kickboxing world heavyweight title, he lost the fight in round 4 to numerous low kicks.

Titles

Kickboxing
Amateur
 2004 Croatian kickboxing championship

Mixed martial arts record

|-
|Win
|align=center| 1–0 
| Bojan Spalević
| TKO
| OB-Gula - Fight Night
| 
|align=center|1
|align=center|
|Ogulin, Croatia
|MMA debut.

Boxing record

|-
|align="center" colspan=8|5 Wins (2 knockouts, 3 decisions), 9 Losses, 0 Draws 
|-
|align=center style="border-style: none none solid solid; background: #e3e3e3"|Res.
|align=center style="border-style: none none solid solid; background: #e3e3e3"|Record
|align=center style="border-style: none none solid solid; background: #e3e3e3"|Opponent
|align=center style="border-style: none none solid solid; background: #e3e3e3"|Type
|align=center style="border-style: none none solid solid; background: #e3e3e3"|Rd., Time
|align=center style="border-style: none none solid solid; background: #e3e3e3"|Date
|align=center style="border-style: none none solid solid; background: #e3e3e3"|Location
|align=center style="border-style: none none solid solid; background: #e3e3e3"|Notes
|-align=center
|Loss
|5-9
|align=left| Fabio Tuiach 
| TKO || 1 , 
|2017-07-08 || align=left| Trieste
|align=left|
|-align=center
|Loss
|5-8
|align=left| Sean Turner 
| KO || 2 , 
|2017-03-10 || align=left| Waterfront Hall, Belfast, Northern Ireland
|align=left|
|-align=center
|Win
|5-7
|align=left| Marin Zulum
| KO || 2 , 
|2017-01-29 || align=left| Sport Hall Graberje, Varazdin
|align=left|
|-align=center
|Loss
|4-7
|align=left| Nathan Gorman
| RTD || 3 , 
|2016-11-26 || align=left| Motorpoint Arena, Cardiff, Wales
|align=left|
|-align=center
|Win
|4-6
|align=left| Mario Jagatić
| PTS || 4, 
|2016-11-19 || align=left| Sport Hall Graberje, Varazdin
|align=left|
|-align=center
|Win
|3-6
|align=left| Tom Dallas
| TKO || 2 , 
|2016-10-26 || align=left| Maidstone Leisure Centre, Maidstone, Kent
|align=left|
|-align=center
|Loss
|2-6
|align=left| Con Sheehan
| PTS || 4 
|2016-09-24 || align=left| Tudor Grange Leisure Centre, Solihull, West Midlands
|align=left|
|-align=center
|Loss
|2-5
|align=left| Zsolt Bogdan
| TKO || 2 , 
|2016-04-16 || align=left| Sportshall, Sülysáp
|align=left|
|-align=center
|Loss
|2-4
|align=left| David Abraham
| PTS || 4 
|2016-03-12 || align=left| York Hall, Bethnal Green, London
|align=left|
|-align=center
|Loss
|2-3
|align=left| Samuel Kadje
| KO || 3 
|2015-11-01 || align=left| Izegem, West-Vlaanderen
|align=left|
|-align=center
|Loss
|2-2
|align=left| AJ Carter
| TKO || 2 
|2015-09-05 || align=left| York Hall, Bethnal Green, London
|align=left|
|-align=center
|Win
|2-1
|align=left| Elvir Behlulovic
| PTS || 4 
|2015-08-13 || align=left| Joker Gym, Split
|align=left|
|-align=center
|Loss
|1-1
|align=left| Dominic Akinlade
| PTS || 4 
|2015-07-04 || align=left| York Hall, Bethnal Green, London
|align=left|
|-align=center
|Win
|1-0
|align=left| Marin Zulum
| PTS || 4 
|2015-04-08 || align=left| Varaždin
|align=left|

Kickboxing and Muay Thai record

|-  bgcolor="#dddddd"
| 2018-5-12 || Win || Mahmudin Mahić || Noć Gladijatora  2018 || Karlovac || K.O || 1  || 1:45 || 20-22-1
|-
|-  bgcolor="FFBBBB"
| 2017-09-16 || Loss ||align=left| Enver Šljivar || W5 Legends Collide || Koper, Slovenia || Decision (Unanimous) || 3 || 3:00 ||19-22-1 
|-
|-  bgcolor="CCFFCC"
| 2017-05-20 || Win ||align=left| Zoran Radić || Noc Gladijatora || Karlovac, Croatia || Decision || 3 || 3:00 ||19-21-1 
|-
|-  bgcolor="CCFFCC"
| 2016-10-08 || Win ||align=left| Sean Šturbelj || Bilić-Erić Security Fight Night 8  || Zagreb, Croatia || TKO || 2 || 1:50 ||18-21-1 
|-
|-  bgcolor="FFBBBB"
| 2016-07-28 || Win ||align=left| Daniel Škvor || Yangame's Fight Night 2016 || Czech Republic || TKO || 1 ||  ||17-21-1 
|-
|-  bgcolor="FFBBBB"
| 2015-04-29 || Loss ||align=left| Roman Kryklia || Tatneft Cup 2015 - 1st selection 1/4 final || Kazan, Russia || KO (Knee to the Head) || 2 ||  ||17-20-1 
|-
|-  bgcolor="CCFFCC"
| 2015-01-24 || Win ||align=left| Saša Polugić || Tatneft Cup 2015 - 2nd selection 1/8 final  || Kazan, Russia || Ext. R. Decision (Unanimous) || 4 || 3:00 ||17-19-1 
|-
|-  bgcolor="FFBBBB"
| 2014-09-26 || Loss ||align=left| Enver Šljivar || FFC Futures 3, Super Fight || Zagreb, Croatia || Decision (Unanimous) || 3 || 3:00 ||16-19-1 
|-
|-  bgcolor="FFBBBB"
| 2014-08-15 || Loss ||align=left| Elmir Mehić || No Limit 7  || Zenica, Bosnia and Herzegovina || Decision (Unanimous) || 3 || 3:00 ||16-18-1
|-
|-  bgcolor="#FFBBBB"
| 2014-05-17 || Loss ||align=left| Petr Kalenda || Kings Of The Ring - Youngblood  || Brno, Czech Republic || Decision (Unanimous) || 3 || 3:00 ||16-17-1
|-
|-  bgcolor="#FFBBBB"
| 2013-12-13 || Loss ||align=left| Tomáš Hron || FFC10: Rodriguez vs. Batzelas || Skopje, Macedonia || Decision (Unanimous) || 3 || 3:00||16-16-1
|-
|-  bgcolor="#FFBBBB"
| 2013-09-21 || Loss||align=left| Yuksel Ayaydin || La Nuit des Challenges 12 || Lyon, France || Decision (Unanimous) || 5 || 3:00||16-15-1
|-
! style=background:white colspan=9 |
|- 
|-  bgcolor="#FFBBBB"
| 2013-09-08 ||Loss ||align=left| Uroš Veličević || K-1 Open Challenger || Brežice, Slovenia || Decision (Unanimous)|| 3 ||3:00||16-14-1
|-  bgcolor="#CCFFCC"
| 2013-05-24 ||Win ||align=left| Uroš Veličević || FFC05: Rodriguez vs. Simonjič || Osijek, Croatia ||Decision (Unanimous) || 3 ||3:00||16-13-1
|-  bgcolor="#CCFFCC"
| 2013-05-10 ||Win ||align=left| Ante Verunica || FFC04: Perak vs. Joni || Zadar, Croatia || Decision (Unanimous) || 3 ||3:00||15-13-1
|-  bgcolor="#CCFFCC"
| 2013-04-07 || Win ||align=left| Mladen Kujundžić ||  8. Kickboxing memorijal "David Šain" || Poreč, Croatia || Decision (Unanimous) || 3 ||3:00||14-13-1
|-  bgcolor="#FFBBBB"
| 2012-08-18 || Loss ||align=left| Rok Štrucl || Admiral Markets Fight Night || Portorož, Slovenia || Decision || 3 || 3:00||13-13-1
|- 
|-  bgcolor="#FFBBBB"
| 2012-04-07 || Loss ||align=left| Gregory Tony || K1 Rules World Championship || Sainte-Maxime, Framce || TKO (Low Kicks) || 4 || ||13-12-1
|-
! style=background:white colspan=9 |
|- 
|-  bgcolor="#FFBBBB"
| 2012-02-10 || Loss ||align=left| Toni Milanović || VVVF - Veni Vidi Vici Fights || Karlovac, Croatia || Decision (Unanimous) || 3 || 3:00||13-11-1
|- 
|-  bgcolor="#CCFFCC"
| 2011-10-21 || Win  ||align=left| Dwight Harkinson || RFC - Romanian Fight Challenge ||Timișoara, Romania  ||Decision (Unanimous) || 3 || 3:00||13-10-1
|-
|-  bgcolor="#FFBBBB"
| 2011-05-14 || Loss ||align=left| Tyrone Spong || It's Showtime 2011 Lyon || Lyon, France || KO (Left Knee) || 1 || 2:01||12-10-1
|- 
|-  bgcolor="#FFBBBB"
| 2011-03-27 || Loss ||align=left| Luboš Raušer || Heroe's Gate || Prague, Czech Republic || Decision || 3 || 3:00||12-9-1
|- 
|-  bgcolor="#FFBBBB"
| 2010-10-29 || Loss  ||align=left| Cătălin Moroșanu || Sarajevo Fight Night II || Sarajevo, Bosnia and Herzegovina || Decision (Unanimous) || 3 || 3:00||12-8-1
|-
|-  bgcolor="#FFBBBB"
| 2010-04-18 || Loss ||align=left| Igor Jurković ||  5. Kickboxing memorijal "David Šain" || Poreč, Croatia || TKO (leg injury) || 2 || ||12-7-1
|-  bgcolor="#CCFFCC"
| 2010-02-13 || Win  ||align=left| Gary Goodridge || Noc Scorpiona 6 || Karlovac, Croatia || Decision (Unanimous) || 3 || 3:00 ||12-6-1
|-
|-  bgcolor="#CCFFCC"
| 2009-04-25 || Win  ||align=left| György Mihalik || FFGP || Dubrovnik, Croatia || TKO || 3 || || 11-6-1
|-
|-  bgcolor="#FFBBBB"
| 2009-02-28 || Loss  ||align=left| Daniel Ghiță || K-1 Rules Tournament 2009 in Budapest || Budapest, Hungary || KO (Low Kicks) ||  1|| 0:30||10-6-1
|-
|-  bgcolor="#c5d2ea"
| 2008-02-06 || Draw  ||align=left| Rani Berbachi || "K-T" Kick tournament || Marseilles, France || Decision Draw ||5 || 3:00||10-5-1
|-
|-  bgcolor="#CCFFCC"
| 2008-09-13 || Win  ||align=left| Benaid Hodžić ||  || Solin, Croatia || KO || 1 || ||10-5
|-
|-  bgcolor="#FFBBBB"
| 2008-06-07 || Loss  ||align=left| Paula Mataele || Dunaujvaros K-1 Max || Dunaújváros, Hungary || Decision ||  || ||9-5
|-
|-  bgcolor="#CCFFCC"
| 2008-04-13 || Win  ||align=left| Jasmin Bečirović || 3. Kickboxing memorijal "David Šain" || Poreč, Croatia || Decision (Split) ||  || ||9-4
|-
|-  bgcolor="#FFBBBB"
| 2008-03-21 || Loss  ||align=left| Tihamer Brunner ||  || Karlovac, Croatia || Decision ||  || ||8-4
|-
|-  bgcolor="#CCFFCC"
| 2007-11-18 || Win  ||align=left| Daniel Marhold || WFC 4 || Domžale, Slovenia || Decision (Unanimous) || 3 || 3:00||8-3
|-
|-  bgcolor="#FFBBBB"
| 2007-09-01 || Loss  ||align=left| Goran Radonjić || Night of Thunderman 3, quarter final || Solin, Croatia || TKO || 1 || ||7-3
|-
|-  bgcolor="#CCFFCC"
| 2007-03-18 || Win  ||align=left| Radovan Obradović ||  || Karlovac, Croatia || Decision ||  || ||7-2
|-
|-  bgcolor="#CCFFCC"
| 2006-04-29 || Win  ||align=left| Mersad Murtić || Noć Gladijatora || Dubrovnik, Croatia || KO || 1 || ||6-2
|-
|-  bgcolor="#CCFFCC"
| 2006-03-17 || Win  ||align=left| Hrvoje Čokotić || Karlovac Nokaut || Karlovac, Croatia || TKO || 2 || ||5-2
|-
|-  bgcolor="#FFBBBB"
| 2006-01-14 || Loss  ||align=left| Marin Došen || Pula Sokol Fight Night || Pula, Croatia || Decision (Unanimous) ||  || ||4-2
|-
|-  bgcolor="#CCFFCC"
| 2005-12-18 || Win  ||align=left| Igor Alagić || Rijeka Nokaut || Rijeka, Croatia || Decision (Split) ||  || ||4-1
|-
|-  bgcolor="#FFBBBB"
| 2005-05-07 || Loss  ||align=left| Ante Lovrić || Obračun u Ringu III || Split, Croatia || Decision (Split) || 3 || 3:00||3-1
|-
|-  bgcolor="#CCFFCC"
| 2005-03-11 || Win  ||align=left| Josip Ivanović ||  || Karlovac, Croatia || Decision ||  || ||3-0
|-
|-  bgcolor="#CCFFCC"
| 2005-02-11 || Win  ||align=left| Zvone Hundarin || Trbovlje 2  || Trbovlje, Slovenia || TKO || 2 ||||2-0 
|-
|-  bgcolor="#CCFFCC"
| 2004-11-06 || Win  ||align=left| Miro Jurjevič || Trbovlje  || Trbovlje, Slovenia || KO || 2 || ||1-0
|-
|-
| colspan=9 | Legend:

See also
 List of male kickboxers
 List of male mixed martial artists
 List of It's Showtime events

References

1979 births
Living people
Croatian male kickboxers
Heavyweight kickboxers